This is a list of Mexican films released in 2013.

References

External links

List of 2013 box office number-one films in Mexico

2013
Films
Mexican